This is an incomplete list that is biased toward current and popular programming.

0-9
 The 180
 2 minutes du peuple

A
 À Propos
 Adler on Line
 Afghanada
 After Hours
 And Sometimes Y
 The Arts Tonight
 As It Happens

B
 Backbencher (2010-2011)
 Backstage with Ben Heppner
 Bandwidth
 Basic Black
 Because News
 Between the Covers
 Brave New Waves
 Bunny Watson

C
 C'est formidable!
 C'est la Vie
 Canada Live (1992–1993)
 Canada Live (2007–)
 Canada Reads
 Canadia: 2056 (2007-2008)
 CBC Radio Overnight
 CBC Radio Three
 CBC Radio 3 Sessions
 CBC Wednesday Night
 Charles Adler Tonight (2016-2021)
 CHUM Chart
 Chatelaine Radio
 The Chuck Swirsky Show
 The Chumps Without a Net
 Cross Country Checkup
 The Current

D
 Day 6
 The Dead Dog Café Comedy Hour
 The Debaters
 Definitely Not the Opera
 DiscDrive (2008)
 Dispatches
 Doc Mailloux
 The Doc Project
 Double Exposure

E
 The Entertainers

F
 Finkleman's 45s	
 Frantic Times
 Freestyle
 Fuse

G
 Gilmour's Albums
 Global Village	
 Go
 The Great Eastern

H
 The Happy Gang (1937-1959)
 Here Come the Seventies
 Here's to You
 High Definition
 The House

I
 Ideas
 In the Key of Charles
 Inside the Music
 The Inside Track
 Inspector Maigret
 The Investigator (1954)
 The Irrelevant Show

J
 Jake and the Kid
 Jazz Beat
 Johnny Chase: Secret Agent of Space (1978-1981)

L
 Late Night Counsell
 Laugh in a Half
 Laugh out Loud
 Live Audio Wrestling
 Lovers and Other Strangers

M
 Madly Off in All Directions
 Marvin's Room
 Medium Rare
 Metro Morning
 Mr. Interesting's Guide to the Continental United States
 Monday Night Playhouse
 Monsoon House
 Morningside (1976-1997)
 Music and Company
 The Mystery Project (1992-2002)

N
 The National Playlist
 National Research Council Time Signal
 Nazi Eyes on Canada
 Nero Wolfe (a.k.a. Rex Stout's Nero Wolfe)
 The Next Chapter
 Nightfall (1980-1983)
 Night Lines
 Nightstream
 The Norm
 Northern Lights
 Now or Never

O

 O'Reilly and the Age of Persuasion
 O'Reilly on Advertising
 The Ongoing History of New Music
 OnStage
 Ontario Morning
 Ontario Today
 OverDrive

P
 Podcast Playlist
 The Point
 Prime Time
 Prime Time Sports

Q
 Q
 Quirks and Quarks

R
 The R3-30
 Radio 2 Morning
 Radio 2 Drive
 The Radio 2 Top 20
 Radio Free Vestibule
 The Radio Show
 RadioSonic (1997-2003)
 Rawhide
 RealTime
 The Review
 ReVision Quest
 Rewind
 The Roundup	
 Royal Canadian Air Farce
 Running with Scissors with Mr. Interesting

S
 Saturday Afternoon at the Opera
 Saturday Night Blues
 Search Engine
 Share the Wealth
 The Signal
 Simply Sean
 Sound Advice
 The Sound Lounge
 Sounds Like Canada
 Spark
 Steve, The First
 Steve, The Second
 The Story from Here
 Strike (2007)
 Studio Sparks
 The Sunday Edition
 Sunday Morning
 Sunday Night Sex Show
 Sunday Showcase
 Sunny Days and Nights

T
 Take Five
 Talking Books
 Tapestry (CBC)
 Tapestry (CHFI)
 This Country in the Morning (1971-1974)
 This I Believe
 This Is That
 This Morning
 Tonic
 Trust Inc. (2012)

U
 Under the Covers
 Unreserved

V
 Vanishing Point (1984-1986)
 Variety Tonight
 The Vinyl Cafe (1994-2015)
 Vinyl Tap

W
 Warren on the Weekend
 What a Week
 White Coat, Black Art
 WireTap
 The World at Six
 World Report
 Writers and Company

See also

 List of UK radio programs
 List of US radio programs
 List of old-time radio people

References
Swartz, Jon D. & Robert C. Reinehr. Handbook of old-time radio: a comprehensive guide to golden age radio listening and collecting. Scarecrow Press, 1993. 

Canadian
Radio programs